Sergey Sergeyevich Zasimovich (born 11 March 1986) is a Kazakhstani high jumper.

Zasimovich was born in Karagandinskaya. As a junior, he finished seventh at the 2004 Asian Junior Championships and twelfth at the 2005 Asian Championships, and won the gold medal at the 2005 Asian Indoor Games. In 2006 he finished fifth at the Asian Indoor Championships, but won the silver medal at the Asian Games. He furthermore won a silver at the 2007 Asian Indoor Games and the gold medal at the 2008 Asian Indoor Championships.

Zasimovich's success at regional meets then waned some, finishing ninth at the 2009 Asian Championships, sixth at the 2010 Asian Indoor Championships and eleventh at the 2011 Asian Championships.

Zasimovich has never reached a final at a major global competition. He competed at the 2007 World Championships, the 2008 World Indoor Championships, the 2008 Olympic Games, the 2009 Summer Universiade, the 2010 World Indoor Championships and the 2010 Asian Games without reaching the final.

Zasimovich's personal best of 2.30 metres was recorded in June 2007 in Bangkok. He is 1.93 m and weighs 72 kg. His father and coach, also called Sergey Zasimovich, was a high jumper as well.

Competition record

References

1986 births
Living people
Kazakhstani male high jumpers
Athletes (track and field) at the 2008 Summer Olympics
Olympic athletes of Kazakhstan
Athletes (track and field) at the 2006 Asian Games
Athletes (track and field) at the 2010 Asian Games
Asian Games medalists in athletics (track and field)
Asian Games silver medalists for Kazakhstan
Medalists at the 2006 Asian Games